Rincón de Ademuz is a Spanish comarca constituted as an exclave of both the Valencian Community and the Valencia province located between the provinces of Cuenca (Castile-La Mancha) and Teruel (Aragon). It is part of the Spanish-speaking area in the Valencian Community.

Geography

Overview
It is a largely rural and sparsely populated area with seven municipalities of which only its capital, Ademuz, has over 1,000 inhabitants. 

The area has the river Turia as its major source of water.

Municipalities
Ademuz
Casas Altas
Casas Bajas
Castielfabib
Puebla de San Miguel
Torrebaja
Vallanca

Bibliography 
Eslava Blasco, R.: Castielfabib y su patrimonio histórico-artístico. Edición del Ayuntamiento de Castielfabib. 286 Pp. . Castielfabib, 2014.
Eslava Blasco, R.: Ademuz y su patrimonio histórico-artístico. Ademuz, 2007.
Eslava Blasco, R.: Vallanca y su patrimonio histórico-artístico religioso. Vallanca, 2006.
Gargallo Gil, J.E.: Habla y cultura popular en el Rincón de Ademuz. Madrid, 2004.
Rodrigo Alfonso, C.: El Rincón de Ademuz, análisis comarcal. Valencia, 1998.
ABABOL. Revista del Instituto Cultural y de Estudios del Rincón de Ademuz (ICERA), dirigida per Ángel Antón Andrés i publicada trimestralment an Ademús des de 1995.

External links

 Official Web page of El Rincón de Ademuz
 ICERA Instituto de Cultura y Estudios del Rincón de Ademuz and its Journal 'ABABOL'
 Children's stories of El Rincón de Ademuz

References

 
Comarques of the Valencian Community
Geography of the Province of Valencia
Enclaves and exclaves